General elections were held in Montserrat in February 1983. The result was a victory for the People's Liberation Movement (PLM), which won five of the seven seats in the Legislative Council. PLM leader John Osborne remained Chief Minister.

Campaign
A total of 22 candidates contested the elections; the PLM and the Progressive Democratic Party both nominated seven, the United National Front nominated four, with the other four candidates running as independents, three of which contested the Northern constituency.

Results

Elected MPs

References

Elections in Montserrat
Montserrat
General election
Montserrat
Montserratian general election